is a 2015 Japanese vampire film directed by Mai Suzuki and starring Mirei Kiritani. It was released on April 17, 2015.

Plot
Kiira seems like an ordinary young girl, who likes to dress up. What differentiates her from others is that she is a vampire. She has never told anyone her secret including her first love, Tetsu. After her parents died when Kiira was 12 years old, she needed to live with her relatives and lost contact with Tetsu. But 8 years later, Tetsu appears at the bakery where Kiira works...

Cast
Mirei Kiritani as Kiira
Shōta Totsuka as Tetsu
Seiichi Tanabe as Rikihiko
Nene Ōtsuka as Maria
Mito Natsume as Natsu
Summer Meng as Miki
Choi Jin-hyuk as Mike
Ekin Cheng as Derek
Akira Emoto as Sōjirō

References

External links
 

2015 films
2010s Japanese films
Japanese vampire films